Aurora High School is one of five high schools in Aurora, Ontario, and is one of two under the jurisdiction of the York Region District School Board.  It serves students from Grades 9 to 12. Aurora High School has a strong French immersion program, and used to serve as the feeder school for many local French immersion public schools, however as of the 2019-2020 school year, the only French immersion elementary school is Lester B. Pearson PS in Aurora. This includes Aurora, Whitchurch-Stouffville, Oak Ridges, and King City

History
The original Aurora High School was built in 1888 on Wells Street. This building was rebuilt in 1923. Parts of this school building are incorporated into the Wells Street Lofts residential complex. The high school student population eventually outgrew the Wells Street building and a new high school was built on Dunning Avenue. This high school, which opened in 1961 and is still in operation in 2018, is called the Dr. G.W. Williams Secondary School. From 1961-1972 Dr. G. W. Williams Secondary School was the only high school in Aurora, Ontario. In 1972, the new Aurora High School opened at 155 Wellington Street West. It can accommodate a student population of approximately 1500 students. As of the 2017/2018 school year Aurora High School has required 4 portable classrooms to accommodate the influx of new students.

Sporting achievements

In 2005, The Senior Boys Cross Country Team won the gold medal in the OFSAA Championships. This capped an impressive career for the squad which included winning the YRAA gold medals three years running (2003–2005), the most decorated and successful single team in any sport in the recent history of the school.

In 2007, Kaitlyn Oliver won an OFSAA gold medal in cross country. In 2008, she also won an OFSAA gold medal in the 3000m and an OFSAA silver medal in cross country. Rob Denault won OFSAA gold medals in the 1500m in 2009, 2010, and 2011. Collectively, they both won numerous YRAA gold medals in both cross country and track throughout their four years at the school. In Fall 2015, Cameron Ormond was the OFSAA cross country Female Champion at the Midget level.

In 2009, 2010, and 2011, the Varsity Women's Ice Hockey team qualified for OFSAA.

Since 2007, the Varsity Alpine Ski and Snowboard Team has secured numerous York Region Championships and 12 OFSAA Gold Team Championships.{Citation needed|date=June 2019}} In 2008, the Varsity Boys Snowboard Team won gold at OFSAA and in both the 2010 and 2011 season the Varsity Boys Level One Alpine Ski Team won gold at OFSAA. In 2010, the Varsity Girls and Boys Snowboard Team took bronze at OFSAA, and in 2012 the Varsity Boys Snowboard Team took silver. In 2015, the Varsity Alpine Boys' Snowboard Team and Varsity Alpine Girls' Ski Team achieved silver at OFSAA, and the Varsity Girls' Snowboard Team were OFSAA Champions. Before this, the last time that the Alpine Team won at OFSSA was in 2000, when the Level One Boys Alpine Ski Team took gold at OFSAA. Since 2016, another five OFSAA golds have been won by the Girls Ski Team and the Girls Snowboard Team.

Robotics
In 2012, the Robotics club won second place in the 2012 Robofest World championship in the Senior Exhibition division.

Music department
The school has a strong arts program, though most of the focus is on its music program. The music department has several ensembles. These include:

 Student-led A Cappella
 Grade Nine Concert Band
 Grade Nine Jazz Band
 Grade Ten Symphonic Band
 Grade Ten Jazz Band
 Grade Eleven Wind Ensemble
 Grade Twelve Wind Symphony
 Senior Winds
 Senior Jazz Band
 Sound and Stage Crew

In addition to these ensembles, the music department also has a Music Council, in which students and teachers plan for music-related events that the department has to offer, such as:
 Halloween Social
 Santa Under the Stars Parade
 Winter Concerts
 Movie/Game Night
 Tie-Dye Night
 Coffee House
 Spring Concerts
 Music Banquet
Along with competitions, the music department travels with their students around the world to places like Washington, Cleveland, New York City, Rome, Florence, Venice, Salzburg, and Vienna every year

Notable former pupils
 Christine Horne
 Alistair Johnston
 Matthew "Big Nut" Sullivan

See also
List of high schools in Ontario

References

External links
 Church Street School, Canada's Historic Places

York Region District School Board
High schools in the Regional Municipality of York
Educational institutions established in 1972
Education in Aurora, Ontario
1972 establishments in Ontario